The municipal elections in Bologna took place on 3 and 4 October 2021. The incumbent Mayor of Bologna was Virginio Merola of Democratic Party, who won the 2016 Bologna municipal election. The centre-left candidate Matteo Lepore won in a landslide with 62% of votes, becoming the most voted mayor since the introduction of direct elections in 1995.

Electoral system 
The voting system is used for all mayoral elections in Italy, in the cities with a population higher than 15,000 inhabitants. Under this system, voters express a direct choice for the mayor or an indirect choice voting for the party of the candidate's coalition. If no candidate receives 50% of votes during the first round, the top two candidates go to a second round after two weeks. The winning candidate obtains a majority bonus equal to 60% of seats. During the first round, if no candidate gets more than 50% of votes but a coalition of lists gets the majority of 50% of votes or if the mayor is elected in the first round but its coalition gets less than 40% of the valid votes, the majority bonus cannot be assigned to the coalition of the winning mayor candidate.

The election of the City Council is based on a direct choice for the candidate with a maximum of two preferential votes, each for a different gender, belonging to the same party list: the candidate with the majority of the preferences is elected. The number of the seats for each party is determined proportionally, using D'Hondt seat allocation. Only coalitions with more than 3% of votes are eligible to get any seats.

Background

Centre-left primary election

Endorsements

Matteo Lepore
 Anna Ascani (PD), current Vicepresident of the Democratic Party (2019–today) and Undersecretary for Economic Development (2021–today)
 Stefano Bonaccini (PD), current President of Emilia-Romagna (2014–today)
 Emily Marion Clancy (SI), municipal councillor for Bologna (2016–today)
 Giuseppe Conte (M5S), former Prime Minister (2018–2021)
 Valentina Cuppi (PD), current President of the Democratic Party (2020–today), mayor of Marzabotto (2019–today)
 Andrea De Maria (PD), Member of the Chamber of Deputies (2013–today), mayor of Marzabotto (1995–2004)
 Vasco Errani (Art.1), former President of Emilia-Romagna (1999–2014)
 Cathy La Torre (Independent), lawyer and LGBT activist, municipal councillor for Bologna (2011–2016)
 Nicola Fratoianni (SI), current Secretary of Italian Left (2017–2019; 2021–today)
 Enrico Letta (PD), current Secretary of the Democratic Party (2021–today) and former Prime Minister (2013–2014)
 Virginio Merola (PD), current Mayor of Bologna (2011–today)
 Dario Nardella (PD), current Mayor of Florence (2014–today)
 Romano Prodi (Independent), former Prime Minister (1996–1998; 2006–2008)
 Peppe Provenzano (PD), current Deputy secretary of the Democratic Party (2021–today) and former Minister for Territorial Cohesion (2019–2021)
 Mattia Santori (Independent), leader of the Sardines movement
 Elly Schlein (GI), current Vicepresident of Emilia-Romagna (2020–today)
 Nicola Zingaretti (PD), President of Lazio (2013–today) and former Secretary of the Democratic Party (2019–2021)

Isabella Conti
 Alberto Aitini (PD), municipal assessor for Bologna (2016–today)
 Mauro Felicori (Independent), regional assessor of Culture (2020–today)
 Gian Luca Galletti (CpE), Minister of Environment (2014–2018), member of the Chamber of Deputies (2006–2013)
 Elisabetta Gualmini (PD), Member of the European Parliament (2019–today)
 Marco Lombardo (PD), municipal assessor for Bologna (2016–today)
 Matteo Renzi (IV), member of the Senate of the Republic (2018–today), former Prime Minister (2014–2016)
 Giampiero Veronesi (PD), Mayor of Anzola dell'Emilia (2014–today)

Parties and candidates
This is a list of the parties (and their respective leaders) which will participate in the election.

Opinion polls

Candidates

Parties

Results

Notes: if a defeated candidate for Mayor obtained over 3% of votes, he/she is automatically elected communal councilor (Battistini); see Italian electoral law of 1993 for Comuni. The candidate elected Mayor is not a member of communal council, but Merola votes in the communal council (see Italian electoral law 1993).

See also 
 2021 Italian local elections

References 

Bologna
Bologna
2021 elections in Italy